Peter Kenneth Laraman (October 24, 1940 - April 28, 2020) ) was an English footballer who played as an inside forward in the Football League. He represented England at youth level.

References

1940 births
Living people
People from Rochester, Kent
English footballers
England youth international footballers
Association football inside forwards
Charlton Athletic F.C. players
Torquay United F.C. players
Canterbury City F.C. players
Durban City F.C. players
Slavia Melbourne players
Sydney Olympic FC players
English Football League players